The Foundation of Martyrs and Veterans Affairs ( Bonyad Shahid va Omur-e Ithargaran) is an Iranian foundation that receives its funding directly from the national budget. Amir-Hossein Ghazizadeh Hashemi is the current director of the organization. The Foundation gives home loans to Disabled Veterans and the families of the martyrs. It has reportedly loaned 120 million rials to urban families and 150 million rials to rural families. The Foundation is also involved in numerous economic endeavors, much like the Mostazafen Foundation of Islamic Revolution.

Economic activity

The Foundations economic activity includes participation in a joint venture with the Industrial Development and Renovation Organization and Iran Electronics Industries' Defense Ministry subsidiary, the Iran Electronic Development Company. In March 2004, this company was part of a consortium that won a mobile-phone license from the Iranian government, but the deal fell through because of political objections.

See also
Bonyad
Economy of Iran
Iranian Economic Reform Plan
IRGC
Banking in Iran
Foundation for the Preservation and Publication of Sacred Defense Works and Values

References

Government agencies of Iran
Foundations based in Iran
Revolutionary institutions of the Islamic Republic of Iran